Sandy Hazell is an English international indoor and lawn bowler.

Bowls career
Hazell won the women's singles at the 1996 World Indoor Bowls Championship before representing England at the 2010 Commonwealth Games where she won, with Jamie-Lea Winch and Sian Gordon, a bronze medal in the woman's triples competition.

In 2012, she won the Hong Kong International Bowls Classic singles title. Two years later in 2014, she was appointed England captain.

References

Living people
1965 births
Bowls players at the 2010 Commonwealth Games
Commonwealth Games bronze medallists for England
English female bowls players
Commonwealth Games medallists in lawn bowls
Indoor Bowls World Champions
Medallists at the 2010 Commonwealth Games